Megacraspedus bilineatella is a moth of the family Gelechiidae. It was described by Peter Huemer and Ole Karsholt in 1996. It is found in Italy.

References

Moths described in 1996
Megacraspedus